Connor Williams (born 29 August 1998) is an English professional rugby league footballer who most recently played as a  for the Hull Kingston Rovers in the Super League.

Background
Williams was born in Wigan, Greater Manchester, England.

Playing career

Playing positions

Senior career

Salford Red Devils (2016-17)
On 3 June 2016, he made his Salford Red Devils' Super League début against the Wigan Warriors. The game at the AJ Bell Stadium, ended in a 20-23 victory to Wigan.

Hull Kingston Rovers (2018)
Williams signed a contract to play for newly-promoted Hull Kingston Rovers ahead of the 2018 Super League campaign.

Williams left Hull Kingston Rovers before the start of the 2019 season without playing a single game for the club, due to longstanding issues with injury.

Dual-registration
In 2017, he featured on dual-registration for two separate clubs, he only appeared on one single occasion for Halifax, he also recorded four appearances and one try for Oldham (Heritage № 1380).

References

External links
Salford Red Devils profile
SL profile

1998 births
Living people
English rugby league players
Halifax R.L.F.C. players
Hull Kingston Rovers players
Oldham R.L.F.C. players
Rugby league centres
Rugby league fullbacks
Rugby league players from Wigan
Rugby league wingers
Salford Red Devils players